Secrets of Nature is a compilation of English-language versions of three Soviet and one East German short documentaries about different aspects of nature. It was compiled in the United States and released there in 1950.

External links
 

1950 films
East German films
Soviet documentary films
1950 documentary films
Soviet black-and-white films
German documentary films
Black-and-white documentary films
1950s Russian-language films
1950s German films